Muhammad Syahmi bin Safari (born 5 February 1998) is a Malaysian professional footballer who plays as a defender for Malaysia Super League club Johor Darul Ta'zim and the Malaysia national team. He plays mainly as a right-back but also can deploy as a right winger.

Club career

Early life
Born and raised in Kuala Selangor, Syahmi was in the Selangor's youth team at the age of 17, having arrived from local side Bukit Jalil Sport School and Harimau Muda C.

Selangor
Syahmi was a key player for Selangor President Cup and Academy, making 46 appearances and scoring two goals. In December 2016, Selangor head coach, P. Maniam confirmed that Syahmi would be definitely promoted to Selangor's first team. Syahmi marked his debut and play 90 minutes of a 2–0 win against Penang in Super League match. On 4 February 2017, Syahmi scored his first Super League goal (and his first goal with Selangor's first team) against PKNS FC, which Selangor lost 5–3.

Johor Darul Ta'zim
On 13 January 2022, it was announced that Syahmi had agreed to sign with champions Johor Darul Ta'zim. He was assigned the number 91.

International career

On 25 August 2016, Syahmi was called up to the Malaysia U-21 for AFF Championship Under-21 in 2016. Syahmi also made appearances during 2017 Southeast Asian Games in Kuala Lumpur.

Career statistics

Club

International

International goals
As of match played 5 December 2018. Malaysia score listed first, score column indicates score after each Syahmi Safari goal.

Honours

Club
Selangor
 President Cup: 2017
Johor Darul Ta'zim
 Malaysia Charity Shield: 2022
 Malaysia FA Cup: 2022

International
Malaysia U23
Southeast Asian Games
 Silver Medal: 2017

Malaysia
 AFF Championship runner-up: 2018

Individual
2018 AFF Championship: Best Goal 
2018 AFF Championship: Best Eleven 
 AFF Best XI: 2019

References

External links
 
 Profile at faselangor.my

1998 births
Living people
Malaysian footballers
Selangor FA players
Malaysia Super League players
Malaysian people of Malay descent
People from Selangor
Association football wingers
Association football midfielders
Southeast Asian Games silver medalists for Malaysia
Southeast Asian Games medalists in football
Footballers at the 2018 Asian Games
Competitors at the 2017 Southeast Asian Games
Asian Games competitors for Malaysia
Competitors at the 2019 Southeast Asian Games
Malaysia international footballers
Malaysia youth international footballers